Horace-Scope is an album by jazz pianist Horace Silver released on the Blue Note label in 1960 featuring performances by Silver with Blue Mitchell, Junior Cook, Gene Taylor, and Roy Brooks.

Reception
Steve Huey, reviewing for AllMusic, described the album as "full of soulful grooves and well-honed group interplay" and ultimately an "eminently satisfying effort".

Track listing
All compositions by Horace Silver except as indicated

 "Strollin'" - 4:59
 "Where You At?" - 5:37
 "Without You" (Don Newey) - 4:50
 "Horace-Scope" - 4:43
 "Yeah!" - 6:28
 "Me and My Baby" - 5:58
 "Nica's Dream" - 6:48

Recorded July 8 (tracks 1-3) & July 9 (tracks 4-7), 1960.

Personnel
Horace Silver - piano
Blue Mitchell - trumpet
Junior Cook - tenor saxophone
Gene Taylor - bass
Roy Brooks - drums

Production
 Alfred Lion - production
 Reid Miles - design
 Rudy Van Gelder - engineering
 Francis Wolff - photography

References

Horace Silver albums
1960 albums
Blue Note Records albums
Albums produced by Alfred Lion
Albums recorded at Van Gelder Studio